Dejan Marović (born 11 June 1960) is a Croatian boxer. He competed in the men's featherweight event at the 1980 Summer Olympics.

References

1960 births
Living people
Yugoslav male boxers
Croatian male boxers
Olympic boxers of Yugoslavia
Boxers at the 1980 Summer Olympics
Sportspeople from Zagreb
Featherweight boxers